Samuel Brent Oscar Riegel, sometimes credited as Jack Lingo,  is an American voice actor, director, and writer. He is a regular cast member of the web series Critical Role, in which he and other fellow voice actors play Dungeons & Dragons. He is best known for voice roles as Donatello in the 2003 Teenage Mutant Ninja Turtles series and Phoenix Wright in the Ace Attorney games. For Nickelodeon, he was the voice director for Fresh Beat Band of Spies and Sanjay and Craig, as well as the voice of Riven in the revival of Winx Club.

Career

He has worked for 4Kids Entertainment, Bang Zoom! Entertainment, TAJ Productions, NYAV Post, and Studiopolis.  In 2018, he received the Daytime Emmy Award for Outstanding Directing in an Animated Program for his work on Danger & Eggs.

He is also a cast member of the popular web series Critical Role, in which he and other voice actors play Dungeons & Dragons. Critical Role was both the Webby Winner and the People's Voice Winner in the "Games (Video Series & Channels)" category at the 2019 Webby Awards; the show was also both a Finalist and the Audience Honor Winner at the 2019 Shorty Awards. After becoming hugely successful, the Critical Role cast left the Geek & Sundry network in early 2019 and set up their own production company, Critical Role Productions. Soon after, they aimed to raise $750,000 on Kickstarter to create an animated series of their first campaign, but ended up raising over $11 million. In November 2019, Amazon Prime Video announced that they had acquired the streaming rights to this animated series, now titled The Legend of Vox Machina; Riegel reprises his role as Scanlan Shorthalt. He hosts the All Work No Play podcast and spinoff web series with his Critical Role co-star and best friend Liam O'Brien.

Personal life 
Riegel is of  Jewish descent. His grandmother was a Holocaust survivor.
He is the brother of actress Eden Riegel and the half-brother of filmmaker Tatiana S. Riegel. His father, Kurt Riegel, is a radio astronomer,  environmental executive, and sailor. His mother, Lenore, is married to author Jerome Charyn.

Riegel lives in Los Angeles with his wife, cinematographer Quyen Tran. They have a daughter and son together.

On September 11, 2001, Riegel and Tran witnessed the 9/11 attacks. They were caught in the dust cloud formed by the collapse of the South Tower, but eventually escaped to Battery Park, where they witnessed the collapse of the North Tower; Riegel captured video footage that has since been featured in several documentaries. Shortly after the events, they moved to California where Tran was accepted to UCLA.

Filmography

Anime

Animation

Films

Video games

Documentary

Web shows and series

References

External links

 
 
 
 

Living people
20th-century American male actors
21st-century American male actors
American male video game actors
American male voice actors
American television writers
American male screenwriters
American male television writers
American voice directors
Jewish American male actors
Jewish American writers
Male actors from Los Angeles
Screenwriters from California
Place of birth missing (living people)
Year of birth missing (living people)
21st-century American Jews